Piano lessons are what you take to learn how to play the piano.

Piano Lessons may also refer to:
 Piano Lessons (book), a 2009 non-fiction book by Anna Goldsworthy
 Piano Lessons (TV series), a 1931 American television series
 "Piano Lessons" (song), a song by Porcupine Tree